The working definition of antisemitism (also called the International Holocaust Remembrance Alliance definition of antisemitism or IHRA definition) is a non-legally binding statement on what antisemitism is which was adopted by the IHRA Plenary (consisting of representatives from 31 countries) in Bucharest, Romania, on 26 May 2016. The statement reads: 

Accompanying the working definition, but of disputed status, are 11 illustrative examples whose purpose is described as guiding the IHRA in its work, seven of which relate to Israel.

The definition was developed during 2003–04 and first published on 28 January 2005 on the website of the European Union agency, the European Monitoring Centre on Racism and Xenophobia (EUMC). The publication was made "without formal review", and remained a working draft until November 2013 when the EUMC's successor agency, the Fundamental Rights Agency (FRA), removed it from its website in "a clear-out of non-official documents".

, the working definition has been accepted by the European Parliament and other national and international bodies and employed for internal use by a number of governmental and political institutions.

The IHRA definition has been criticised by some academics who say that it stifles free speech relating to criticism of Israeli actions and policies. High-profile controversies took place in the United Kingdom in 2011 within the University and College Union and within the Labour Party in 2018. The definition has been contested for weaknesses that critics say lend themselves to abuse, for obstructing campaigning for the rights of Palestinians and for being too vague. One of the original drafters, Kenneth S. Stern, has opposed the "weaponizing" of the definition on college campuses in ways that might suppress and limit free speech.

Background

European Monitoring Centre on Racism and Xenophobia
The Commission on Racism and Xenophobia (CRX) (also known as the Kahn Commission) was established in 1994. The CRX was transformed into the European Monitoring Centre on Racism and Xenophobia (EUMC) by Council Regulation (EC) No 1035/97 of 2 June 1997 and commenced in June 1998. Its mandate was to monitor different forms of racism and xenophobia.

In 2002, it published a large-scale monitoring report on Islamophobia since 9/11, including a total of 75 reports, 15 from each member state and a synthesis report. This was to be followed by a comparable report on antisemitism. A report entitled Manifestations of antisemitism in the EU 2002–2003 was published in May 2004, along with a second report on perceptions of antisemitism based on interviews with European Jews. The antisemitism report was based on data collected by the 15 contact points of EUMC's monitoring network, RAXEN, then the robustness of the data evaluated by an independent researcher, Alexander Pollak. The report included a section on definitions, which concluded by proposing this definition: 
"Any acts or attitudes that are based on the perception of a social subject (individual, group, institution, or state) as "the ('deceitful', 'corrupt', 'conspiratorial', etc.) Jew".

The report also explored the question of when anti-Zionist or anti-Israel expression might be antisemitic (pp. 13–14) and highlighted the need to develop a common EU definition in order to collect and compare incidents across countries (pp. 25–29).

In December 2003, the Centre for Research on Antisemitism (ZfA) analyzed a pre-release version of the EUMC report. The ZfA report was leaked to the press and poorly received. According to civil rights lawyer Kenneth L. Marcus, in the report the primary cause of rising antisemitism in Europe was assigned to young Muslim males, while in a press release for the subsequent final publication the EUMC assigned the rise in antisemitism to "young, disaffected white Europeans." Marcus writes, the larger issue was missed that the definition of antisemitism that the EUMC used was based on "seven stereotypical traits: deceptiveness, strange-ness, hostility, greed, corruption, conspiratorial power, and deicidal murderousness." The EUMC report concluded that anti-Israeli and anti-Zionism expression could only be considered antisemitic if it was based on the stereotype of Israel as the collective Jew.

Following the EUMC report, the Organization for Security and Co-operation in Europe (OSCE)'s Berlin Declaration recognised that post WW2 antisemitism had changed and was now at times directed against Jews as a collective and Israel as an embodiment of the Jew. The Berlin Declaration also tasked the OSCE's Office for Democratic Institutions and Human Rights (ODIHR) to work with the EUMC to develop better ways to monitor antisemitic incidents in OSCE countries. At the same time, according to Marcus, the EUMC, largely due to pressure from American Jewish organizations, scrapped its failed definition of antisemitism.

2004 Stern, Porat and Bauer version
Israeli scholar Dina Porat, then head of the Stephen Roth Institute at Tel Aviv University, proposed the idea for a common definition during an NGO conference organized by the American Jewish Committee (AJC). Kenneth S. Stern of the AJC, a human rights lawyer, was critical of the EUMC's original definition, as it was confusing about when attacks on Jews related to the Israel/Palestine conflict could be considered antisemitic, and required investigators to know the intentions of attackers. Meanwhile, the EUMC asked "selected Jewish NGOs and academics to provide a simple working definition that would encompass antisemitic demonization of Israel, and which could also be used by their own RAXEN network of national focal points and by law enforcement agencies."

During 2003–04, involving the "efforts of a large number of institutes and individual experts", and coordinated by Stern, together with Dina Porat, Holocaust scholars Yehuda Bauer, Michael Berenbaum and Roni Stauber, the Community Security Trust's Michael Whine, human rights expert Felice D. Gaer, and others, a proposed definition and set of examples was drafted. Stern's draft working definition identified that some criticism of Israel and of Zionism are antisemitic: 
Antisemitism is hatred toward Jews because they are Jews and is directed toward the Jewish religion and Jews individually or collectively. More recently, antisemitism has been manifested in the demonization of the State of Israel.

Antisemitism frequently charges Jews with conspiring to harm humanity, and it is often used to blame Jews for "why things go wrong." It is expressed in speech, writing, visual forms and action, and employs sinister stereotypes and negative character traits. (It may also be manifested on people mistaken as Jews, or on non-Jews seen as sympathetic to Jews.)

This was then followed by a list of illustrative examples, including five examples of the ways in which antisemitism manifests itself with regard to the State of Israel. According to both Marcus and Antony Lerman, the novel element in Stern's draft definition was identifying certain forms of criticism of Israel and Zionism as antisemitic, and Marcus also highlights the "praxeological" nature of the definition and its examples, i.e. its focus on pragmatic identification rather than scholarly understanding.

EUMC publication

Initial publication
At the suggestion of the AJC, the EUMC director organized a meeting of Jewish representatives to discuss the new definition of antisemitism which had been drafted by Stern; the consultation involved representatives of the AJC and European Jewish Congress, the EUMC director and head of research, and the ODIHR Tolerance and Non-Discrimination program director and antisemitism expert. The outcome was negotiated between Andrew Baker, Stern's colleague at the AJC, and Beate Winkler, director of the EUMC. Again Stern was tasked with drafting the final text. Additionally, according to Michael Whine of the Community Security Trust, "the Director of the ODIHR Tolerance and Non-Discrimination Division and the Advisor on Antisemitism played an active role in formulating the Working Definition."

On 28 January 2005, the EUMC published on its website a working definition of antisemitism which shared many features of Stern's earlier draft. Winkler published the definition "without formal review by her political overseers". Marcus writes that it was a "working definition" in two senses: a working guide to identifying antisemitism in practice, and a work-in-progress as opposed to a final statement to be approved by the EU's political leadership: "for this reason, formal endorsement was neither sought nor obtained."

The stated purpose of the definition was to "provide a guide for identifying incidents, collecting data and supporting the implementation and enforcement of legislation dealing with antisemitism", and the working definition stated: "Antisemitism is a certain perception of Jews, which may be expressed as hatred toward Jews. Rhetorical and physical manifestations of antisemitism are directed toward Jewish or non-Jewish individuals and/or their property, toward Jewish community institutions and religious facilities."

The definition included the concept of collective antisemitism. Several examples relate to animus towards Israel, including both Holocaust inversion and the application of double standards to Israel. The definition states that "However, criticism of Israel similar to that leveled against any other country cannot be regarded as antisemitic." The EUMC separated the working definition with eleven examples. This was presented as two separate groups, the first six examples were antisemitic tropes and the following five examples were introduced with the sentence: "Examples of the ways in which antisemitism manifests itself with regard to the state of Israel taking into account the overall context could include".

The EUMC working definition was prominently referenced by the OSCE Cordoba conference in June that year. According to Lerman, the definition was promoted by the AJC, other American Jewish organizations, national Jewish representative bodies, Jewish defence organizations, the Israeli government, pro-Israel advocacy groups, and was approved by the OSCE and other pan-European organizations. According to Lerman, the EUMC working definition was widely criticized and the organization was put under pressure by supporters and critics of the definition.

Use of the EUMC definition
In 2008, the European Forum on Antisemitism commissioned translations of the Working Definition into each of the 33 languages used by the OSCE states.

In 2010, Stern wrote that "In the last five years, the definition has been increasingly used, because it is provides a workable, non-ideological approach to task of identifying antisemitism." The definition was used by monitoring agencies and law enforcement officials in some European countries. According to Stern, by 2010, the definition had been referenced or relied upon in or by courts (in Lithuanian and Germany), congressional hearings in the United States, online reference tools, newspapers, blogs, scholarly articles, legal articles, radio shows, student groups, museums, national inquiries of parliamentarians (most importantly in the UK), international meetings of parliamentarians, United States Department of State Reports, The United States Commission on Civil Rights, and in submissions to the United Nations Economic and Social Council Commission on Human Rights, Sub-Commission on the Promotion and Protection of Human Rights... It continues to be referenced more and more because of its clear utility.  For example, in Lithuania, it was referred to in a successful criminal case against an editor of a right-wing newspaper in 2005.

The definition was used to some extent by some intergovernmental and EU agencies. For example, the OSCE used the definition in a 2005 report Education on the Holocaust and Antisemitism: An Overview and Analysis of Educational Approaches. By 2010 it was recommended in the course leaders' Facilitators Guide in the OSCE OHDIR programme to assist law enforcement officials to understand and investigate hate crime, and at the 2010 OSCE High Level Conference on Tolerance and Non-Discrimination in Astana urged participating states to use and promote the Working Definition. In February 2009, the Inter-parliamentary Coalition for Combating Antisemitism conference, in the London Declaration on Combating Antisemitism, issued a call to governments to expand the use of the Working Definition.

Canadian Members of Parliament adopted a resolution to combat antisemitism in 2007 that cited the definition, and the Australian Online Hate Prevention Institute.According to Andrew Baker of the AJC, the definition is used by the Justice Ministers of Austria and Germany in training prosecutors and judges. It was also adopted formally by other governmental and non-governmental organizations in some countries.

United Kingdom
In 2006, the All-Party Parliamentary Inquiry into Antisemitism recommended that the UK adopt the definition and that it be promoted by the Government and law enforcement agencies. The Government Response the following year recognised the "useful work being done by the EUMC in identifying antisemitic discourse", noted that the government accepted the definition of racism in the MacPherson Report on institutional racism and that this subsumed the EUMC and went further. It also noted that "from the EUMC's evidence to the Committee", the "definition is in fact a work in progress and has not been recommended to states for adoption". However, it undertook to re-examine this if the EUMC's successor body, the FRA, did recommend it for adoption, an undertaking it repeated the following year in its progress report on implementing the Inquiry's recommendations, noting this had been delayed by the process of transforming into the FRA delayed this. In 2009, the leaders of the Labour and Conservative parties signed the London Declaration endorsing the definition.

The National Union of Students formally adopted the Working Definition at its 2007 Conference. Some individual students unions followed suit, although at others motions to do so were defeated. In 2011, the University and College Union passed a resolution opposing the use of the definition, which led to the Jewish Leadership Council and Board of Deputies of British Jews describing the union as "institutionally antisemitic".

On 1 January 2015, Professor David Feldman stated in a Sub-Report for the Parliamentary Committee Against Antisemitism that the definition had "largely has fallen out of favour" due to criticisms received.

United States
According to Ken Marcus, the United States Commission on Civil Rights, after investigating campus antisemitism, adopted the definition, to help universities identify the lines between hateful and non-hateful incidents. According to the AJC, in 2007 the EUMC definition was adopted as "an initial guide" by the Office to Monitor and Combat Anti-Semitism within the U.S. Department of State, stating that it "should not be construed... as United States policy".

In 2008, the State Department again endorsed the Working Definition in their Contemporary Global Antisemitism report to Congress, noting that "a widely accepted definition of antisemitism can be useful in setting the parameters of the issue. Such a definition also helps to identify the statistics that are needed and focuses attention on the issues that policy initiatives should address….The EUMC's working definition provides a useful framework for identifying and understanding the problem and is adopted for the purposes of this report."

In June 2010 the State Department adopted a definition based on the EUMC definition, According to Marcus, while it was in effect the State Department definition was more important in determining U.S. government foreign policy than the EUMC definition since it represented an official policy position.

In 2011, the AJC's Ken Stern and Cary Nelson, President of the American Association of University Professors published a letter stating that "It is a perversion of the definition to use it, as some are doing, in an attempt to censor what a professor, student, or speaker can say"; this generated significant controversy within the American Jewish community.

The State Department has since adopted the IHRA definition.

On 12 January 2016, Peter Roskam and Tim Scott introduced a bipartisan bill in the House and Senate on combating antisemitism on campus, under the title of The Anti-Semitism Awareness Act, to codify the working definition. It would require the US Department of Education to refer to the definition in deciding if educational institutions had violated Title VI of the Civil Rights Act of 1964 by tolerating antisemitic harassment. It was passed in the Senate, and on 22 December 2016 it was referred to the United States House Judiciary Subcommittee on the Constitution and Civil Justice. This hearing was held on 7 November 2017; it "took a heated turn" as four of the nine witnesses argued that the definition infringes on freedom of speech regarding Israel.

On 23 May 2018, the same bills were reintroduced with minor amendments. On 24 July 2018 they were referred again to the Subcommittee on the Constitution and Civil Justice. The Bill was criticised as an attack on free speech, including by the American Civil Liberties Union (ACLU) and James Zogby of the Arab American Institute.

FRA removal
The EUMC never granted any official status to the definition. In 2007, the EU replaced the EUMC with the Fundamental Rights Agency (FRA), with a broader remit than racism and antisemitism. It has continued to deliver annual reports of antisemitic incidents in the EU countries, based on data from its national contact points.

Richard Kuper reported that the FRA told him around 2011 that: "Since its development we are not aware of any public authority in the EU that applies it [and the] FRA has no plans for any further development." He noted that an August 2010 FRA publication on antisemitism did not mention the working definition.

Following on from the EUMC's 2004 report, the FRA's 2012 report on antisemitism equates New antisemitism with anti-Zionism. FRA also used the term secondary antisemitism to define similar accusations against Jews for using the Holocaust to manipulate non-Jews.

In 2013, the FRA confirmed that it did not have the authority to "either set or repudiate any definitions" of antisemitism.

In November 2013, the FRA removed the definition from its website in "a clear-out of non-official documents"; a spokesperson stated at the time that "We are not aware of any official definition [of antisemitism]". In April 2016, Middle East Monitor reported that, in response to a motion passed at the UK National Union of Students annual conference endorsing the definition, the FRA stated that the working definition "is not an official EU definition and has not been adopted by FRA".

IHRA publication
On 26 May 2016, IHRA adopted a non-legally binding working definition of antisemitism. The IHRA adoption took place following the efforts of Mark Weitzman of the Simon Wiesenthal Center, at the Bucharest plenary meeting of the IHRA on 30 May 2016, where its 31 member countries voted to adopt it. Weitzman later told a workshop that the definition was copied from the EUMC version as there was "not enough time to invent a new one". The decision to adopt the text was based on consensus among IHRA's 31 member countries.

The document included two sections, a two-sentence definition plus the list of 11 examples. IHRA's 38-word basic "working definition" of antisemitism reads:

The IHRA states that "the Working Definition, including its examples, was reviewed and decided upon" by the plenary.
In the press release announcing the adoption of the definition, along with the definition itself, were listed the same eleven examples that featured in the EUMC definition, which the IRHA stated would be used to guide it in its work. After the caveat, "taking into account the overall context", the examples of what could constitute antisemitism include "Accusing Jewish citizens of being more loyal to Israel, or to the alleged priorities of Jews worldwide, than to the interests of their own nations" and "claiming that the existence of a State of Israel is a racist endeavor" (and nine other examples).

Antony Lerman notes that the EUMC and IHRA definitions are set out differently. The EUMC 38-word working definition is distinguished from the rest of the text by being set in bold type. The same text in the IHRA definition is also in bold type, and enclosed in a box containing the longer part of a prefatory sentence that begins outside the box. According to Middle East Monitor, citing an email, on 12 September 2017 the IHRA Permanent Office in Berlin confirmed: "[…] The Plenary of the International Holocaust Remembrance Alliance (IHRA) adopted the working definition of antisemitism under the Romanian Chairmanship on 26 May 2016. The working definition, like all IHRA decision, is non-legally binding. The working definition is the text in the box…" and that when their reporter sought explicit confirmation from IHRA was advised to "just include a link to the IHRA website". Lerman states that this confirmed that the definition and the examples were separate things. He said "The discussions, as I remember them, were quite intense and lengthy, both in the couloirs and in the plenary hall, until a decisive step was taken by the presidency, on the demand by some member states. Namely, the original draft text was cut into two, and only the first two-sentence part was to be the working-definition to be adopted, while the other part, the examples, remained what they were: examples to serve as illustrations, to guide the IHRA in its work. From then on, the plenary was able to move quickly on, and the non-legally binding working definition was unanimously adopted." In 2021 Al-Jazeera reported that "the governing plenary decided to adopt only the two-sentence passage as its definition, excluding the controversial examples. The examples were not endorsed as part of the working definition but as "illustrations" to "guide IHRA in its work".

Adoption
The IHRA definition has been adopted for internal use by a number of government and political institutions. By 2018, according to Lerman, the IHRA definition had been formally adopted by six of the 31 governments whose countries are members of IHRA though it is unclear whether those countries adopted the attached examples. The countries adopting the IHRA definition also appointed a national coordinator for the fight against antisemitism.

In late 2016, adoption of the definition by the Organization for Security and Cooperation in Europe was blocked by Russia. The United Kingdom was the first country to adopt the definition (12 December 2016), followed by Israel (22 January 2017), Austria (25 April 2017), Scotland (27 April 2017), Romania (25 May 2017), Canada (23 August 2017), and Germany (20 September 2017). In October 2017, Bulgaria adopted the IHRA definition of antisemitism and appointed Deputy Foreign Minister Georg Georgiev as national co-ordinator for the fight against antisemitism.

The European Parliament called for member states to adopt the IHRA definition on 1 June 2017 - although Lerman notes that this is without explicitly quoting the examples. As of 29 March 2019, Lithuania (24 January 2018), Moldova (20 January 2019), and North Macedonia have also adopted the IHRA definition. In November 2019, Greek Prime Minister announced that Greece was set to adopt the IHRA definition. On 5 December 2019, France's National Assembly called on the government to adopt the IHRA definition. According to Alan Shatter, Ireland has neither adopted nor formally endorsed the definition and on 9 November 2021, the Minister for Children, Equality and Integration, Roderic O'Gorman said that while Ireland was "supportive of the definition", it "did not consider the illustrative examples that followed to be an integral part of the definition".

Cyprus was the seventeenth country to adopt the IHRA definition (December 2019) as a useful guidance tool in education and training. Italy adopted the IHRA definition in January 2020, and appointed Professor Milena Santerini as national coordinator against antisemitism. Serbia and Argentina adopted the IHRA definition in June 2020, and Kosovo and Albania in October 2020 (Albanian Member of Parliament Taulant Balla proposed a measure to adopt the definition, and the measure was accepted unanimously by the Parliament of Albania, with Albania becoming the first Muslim country to formally adopt the definition).

In addition, at a sub-national or institutional level, the US state of South Carolina, the United States Department of Education, the city of Bal Harbour in Florida, the Greek Ministry of Education, Research and Religious Affairs, and Western Washington University have adopted it.

Israel's Minister of Strategic Affairs wrote an op-ed in Newsweek in July 2020 calling for social media companies to fully adopt the working definition, and the following month 120 organizations, led by StopAntisemitism.org, which is funded by philanthropist Adam Milstein, sent a letter to Facebook's Board of Directors, calling upon them to fully adopt the IHRA definition as the "cornerstone of Facebook's hate speech policy regarding antisemitism." According to Neve Gordon, Facebook responded by saying its definition "draws on the spirit—and the text—of the IHRA" but demonstrated reluctance to adopt the examples that relate to Israel, and critics of the definition also lobbied the company not to adopt it.

According to the American Jewish Committee, as at August, 2021, a total of 32 countries have adopted the IHRA definition. According to the Jerusalem Post, as at 26 September 2021, the IHRA definition has been adopted by 29 countries, the European Union, and numerous local governments and institutions around the world.

On 14 October 2021, Australian Prime Minister Scott Morrison announced that Australia would formally adopt the IHRA definition. While the announcement was welcomed by Zionist advocacy groups including AIJAC (the Australia/Israel and Jewish Affairs Council) and the Zionist Federation of Australia, the New Israel Fund Australia and Australia Palestine Advocacy Network expressed concerns that the IHRA definition could be used to silence criticism of Israeli policies and actions.

On 24 June 2022, New Zealand formally became an observer of the IHRA, joining 44 countries working to promote Holocaust education, research, and commemoration. While the announcement was welcomed by the New Zealand Jewish Council and the Holocaust Centre of New Zealand as a means of combating racism and anti-Semitism, Palestine Solidarity Network Aotearoa chairman John Minto claimed that adopting the IHRA definition would silence criticism of Israeli human rights abuses against the Palestinians.

United States 
On December 11, 2019, President Donald Trump signed an executive order on combatting antisemitism. The order specifies that agencies responsible for enforcement of Title VI of the Civil Rights Act of 1964 must take into consideration the working definition of antisemitism, as well as the IHRA list of Contemporary Examples of Anti-Semitism, "to the extent that any examples might be useful as evidence of discriminatory intent," when investigating complaints, expanding Title VI to protect against discrimination based on antisemitism.

United Kingdom
In March 2016, the UK government published a short article on defining antisemitism, authored by Eric Pickles, then Secretary of State for Communities and Local Government, which stated "for those seeking a definition of antisemitism, the UK's College of Policing does include a working definition of antisemitism [i.e. the EUMC working definition] in their guidance to police forces in the UK", which was then quoted in full in the article.<ref>"A definition of antisemitism" Published 30 March 2016 Foreign & Commonwealth Office and The Rt Hon Lord Pickles. The article cites Hate Crime Operational Guidance College of Policing 2014, section 3.2.3 pp.35-28</ref>

In October 2016, the cross-party Commons Home Affairs Select Committee reported on antisemitism in the UK. Its report included a long section on defining antisemitism, including a discussion of the working definition, noting that the President of the Board of Deputies of British Jews gave evidence describing the definition as "helpful, comprehensive and fit for purpose", as well as a summary of some criticisms of the definition. Among the committee's recommendations were "that the IHRA definition, with our additional caveats, should be formally adopted by the UK Government, law enforcement agencies and all political parties, to assist them in determining whether or not an incident or discourse can be regarded as antisemitic." The caveats were two additional clarifications designed to protect freedom of speech in discussion of Israel/Palestine:
It is not antisemitic to criticise the Government of Israel, without additional evidence to suggest antisemitic intent. It is not antisemitic to hold the Israeli Government to the same standards as other liberal democracies, or to take a particular interest in the Israeli Government's policies or actions, without additional evidence to suggest antisemitic intent.

In December 2016, the UK government responded that it had agreed to adopt the IHRA definition, but that the caveats were unnecessary given the definition's clause "criticism of Israel similar to that levelled against any other country cannot be regarded as antisemitic" is sufficient to ensure freedom of speech. The government also noted that the police already used a previous version of the definition (the EUMC version) and that it "is a useful tool for criminal justice agencies and other public bodies to use to understand how anti-Semitism manifests itself in the 21st century". Later that month, the government announced it would formally adopt the definition.

Subsequently, the definition has been adopted by some 120 UK councils and by the London Assembly and the Mayor of London. In July 2018, an Early Day Motion was proposed by Labour Party MP Luciana Berger and signed by 39 mainly Labour MPs welcomed the UK's formal adoption of the definition and noted that the Welsh and Scottish Governments, the Greater Manchester Combined Authority, London Assembly, and over 120 local councils had formally adopted the definition.

It has also been adopted by religious and educational institutions such as the Church of Scotland and King's College London. However, in 2017 a resolution to the University and College Union called for the union to formally reject the definition.

In August 2019, Tower Hamlets London Borough Council refused to host the fifth annual charity bike ride event in aid of Palestinian children in Gaza called BigRide4Palestine due to concerns that criticism of Israel would violate the IHRA working definition of antisemitism. Antony Lerman concluded that the working definition was an obstacle to constructive criticism of Israel. Twenty three signatories of an open letter to The Guardian stated that the council's refusal to host the charity event has vindicated concerns raised about the working definition and that it "demonstrates that freedom of expression on Palestine in this country is now being suppressed". The signatories included Geoffrey Bindman, Lindsey German, Nadia Hijab, Kate Hudson, Dr Ghada Karmi, Mike Leigh, Jenny Manson, Kika Markham, Karma Nabulsi, Clare Short, Norman Warner and Mark Serwotka.

In September 2019, Robert Jenrick, the newly appointed Secretary of State for Housing, Communities and Local Government, wrote in the Sunday Express:

Labour Party

In December 2016, Labour adopted the working definition. It was formally accepted at the 2017 Labour Party Conference.

In July 2018, the Labour Party National Executive Committee (NEC) adopted without a vote a definition of antisemitism based on the IHRA definition, although it removed or amended four out of eleven IHRA examples, added three examples, and amended points showing how criticising Israel can be antisemitic. Labour said the wording in the code of conduct "expands on and contextualises" the IHRA examples. The Shadow Solicitor-General, Nick Thomas-Symonds, said many of IHRA's examples were "adopted word for word in our code of conduct" while "the ground is covered" for others. He said: "We should be going further than the IHRA definition and the language of the code is at times much stronger. We need to expand on a lot of the examples to ensure that we have a legally enforceable code so that we can enforce discipline as everyone wants to." The NEC's modified examples sparked criticism amid allegations of antisemitism, leading the NEC to announce that it would review the decision in consultation with the UK Jewish community.

A statement by the UK Delegation to the IHRA stated that "Any 'modified' version of the IHRA definition that does not include all of its 11 examples is no longer the IHRA definition. Adding or removing language undermines the months of international diplomacy and academic rigour that enabled this definition to exist. If one organization or institution can amend the wording to suit its own needs, then logically anyone else could do the same. We would once again revert to a world where antisemitism goes unaddressed simply because different entities cannot agree on what it is."

In September 2018, the NEC decided to add all 11 IHRA examples (unamended) to the definition of antisemitism. A few days later the Parliamentary Labour Party voted by a majority of 205 to adopt the unamended definition to their standing orders.

Later in the month, a report by the Media Reform Coalition examined over 250 articles and broadcast news segments of coverage of Labour's revised code of conduct on antisemitism, and found over 90 examples of misleading or inaccurate reporting. The research found evidence of "overwhelming source imbalance" in which coverage often entirely omitted critical discussion of the ‘working definition’ and wrongly presented it as consensual and universally adopted, whilst few news reports stated that mainstream academic and legal opinion was overwhelmingly critical of the IHRA definition, including formal opinions from four leading UK barristers.

Other political parties
In July 2018, the Conservative Party claimed it had adopted the definition in full. However, at the time their code of conduct approved in December 2017, which only governs the behavior of anyone representing the Party as an elected or appointed official or office-holder, did not mention antisemitism or specify a definition of it. Since then their code has been amended to include an interpretive annexe on discrimination, which does refer to the IHRA definition and says it was adopted in December 2016 (the date the Conservative government adopted the definition).

In September 2018, the Liberal Democrats formally adopted the IHRA definition with the working examples.

In October 2018, Green Party of England and Wales did not adopt the definition. Their home affairs spokesman and former deputy leader, Shahrar Ali, told their annual conference the definition was "politically engineered to restrict criticism of Israel's heinous crimes upon the Palestinian people".

Universities
According to the results of a Freedom of Information request filed in 2020 by the Union of Jewish Students (UJS) 29 of 133 universities had adopted the definition, with a further 80 institutions having no current plans to do.

Subsequently, education secretary Gavin Williamson accused institutions of "dragging their feet" and warned that funding streams could be suspended. Following the letter, the UJS said that the number of adoptees rose to 48 while an open letter from a group of lawyers accused the education secretary of "improper interference" with universities' autonomy and right to free expression. In February 2021, University College London's governing body, having previously adopted the IHRA definition, said that it will reconsider the matter following rejection by an internal academic board which called on the university to "retract and replace IHRA working definition with a more precise definition of antisemitism". In a July 2021 opinion piece for the activist Labour Briefing, Jonathan Rosenhead stated that the government pressure "didn't go down well with university administrations" and that the arrival of the new Jerusalem Declaration on Antisemitism has affected campus debate.

As of May 2021, the student governments at 30 universities in the United States had adopted the definition.

 United Nations 
In early 2022, on the occasion of International Holocaust Remembrance Day, United Nations Secretary-General Antonio Guterres reiterated a previous position, acknowledging  "the efforts of countries that have agreed on the common definition of antisemitism" while at the same time avoiding any mention of adoption by the UN as demanded by supporters. Guterres recited the definition itself but not the examples. On 31 October 2022, E. Tendayi Achiume, the special rapporteur on contemporary racism, delivered a report that said the working definition was both ineffective and had "an impact on the human rights of minorities and vulnerable groups, including Jews", calling the definition "controversial" and "divisive". The United States envoy said he was "disappointed" that the report "politicized the IHRA definition" and Gilad Erdan, the Israeli ambassador criticised Achiume for making "unfounded recommendations" that "clearly demonstrate a political agenda." In recent years, criticism of the definition has grown with critics arguing that it "primarily targets criticism of Israel and that it has been weaponized against Palestinian activists". In a statement published on 3 November 2022, 128 scholars, including leading Jewish academics at Israeli, European, United Kingdom and United States universities, said the definition has been "hijacked" and urged the United Nations not to adopt the definition due to its "divisive and polarising" effect.

Criticism
Academic
In March 2005, Brian Klug argued that this definition proscribed legitimate criticism of the human rights record of the Israeli Government by attempting to bring criticism of Israel, and criticism of Israeli actions and criticism of Zionism as a political ideology into the category of antisemitism and racially based violence towards, discrimination against, or abuse of, Jews.

In December 2016, David Feldman wrote: "I fear this definition is imprecise, and isolates antisemitism from other forms of bigotry." He also said: "The text also carries dangers. It trails a list of 11 examples. Seven deal with criticism of Israel. Some of the points are sensible, some are not." He added: "Crucially, there is a danger that the overall effect will place the onus on Israel's critics to demonstrate they are not antisemitic."

In February 2017, a letter signed by 243 British academics, who asserted that the "violation of the rights of Palestinians for more than 50 years" should not be silenced, contends "this definition seeks to conflate criticism of Israel with anti-Semitism" and raised concerns about muddying the definition of anti-Semitism and restricting free debate on Israel.

In July 2018, Antony Lerman wrote: "investing all in the IHRA working definition of antisemitism is just making matters worse. This is the time to take the path to working with other minority groups, civil society organizations and human rights bodies to confront antisemitism within the context of a wider antiracist struggle, not to perpetuate the notion that Jews stand alone." He later stated that "the case against IHRA is so strong" and "...the fundamental principle that IHRA is so flawed it should be abandoned..." In August 2019, he wrote: "The vagueness of the 'working definition' of antisemitism has licensed a free-for-all of interpretation, delighting opponents of Palestinian demands for equal rights."

In the same month, Klug wrote: "...critics maintain that Labour (or anyone else) has to adopt the IHRA document 'in full'. But the text is not written in stone. It is a working definition with working examples. It is a living document, subject to revision and constantly needing to be adapted to the different contexts in which people apply its definition... But people of goodwill who genuinely want to solve the conundrum – combating antisemitism while protecting free political speech – should welcome the code as a constructive initiative, and criticise it constructively... For this to happen, the seas of language are going to have to subside and critics must stop treating the IHRA document as immutable. In the Judaism in which I was nurtured and educated, there is only one text whose status is sacred; and it was not written by a committee of the IHRA."

In August 2018, Rebecca Ruth Gould, Professor of Islamic world and comparative literature at the University of Birmingham, published the first extended scholarly critique of the IHRA definition: "Legal Form and Legal Legitimacy: The IHRA Definition of Antisemitism as a Case Study in Censored Speech" in the journal Law, Culture and the Humanities. Gould described "the IHRA definition as a quasi-law" and documents the meaning of the IHRA document's self-description as "legally non-binding," the history of its application, and the legal dynamics bearing on its deployment in university contexts. In a later opinion piece, Gould stated that "These dimensions are made all the more contentious by its imprecise content and the significant ambiguity around its legal status. On the basis of the many ways in which the IHRA definition has been used to censor speech, particularly on university campuses" and "that the definition's proponents have not paid enough attention to the harms of censoring Israel-critical speech." In the journal article, she also noted that since the adoption of the IHRA definition "at least five universities [in the UK], and likely many more, have had planned events cancelled or otherwise censored due to a perceived need to comply with this definition, even in the absence of its legal ratification."

In July 2019, Geoffrey Alderman wrote: "those who framed the IHRA's Working Definition of antisemitism were well-intentioned, and the definition itself has commendable features. But it's merely a work-in-progress." He later wrote "...endorsements have endowed the IHRA definition with almost sacrosanct status. But that does not mean that it is either perfect or even fit for purpose. It is – in fact – neither" and that it is "deeply-flawed and much misunderstood".

In January 2021, 66 UK Israeli academics wrote an open letter to Vice Chancellors, Members of Academic Senates, all other UK Academics and Students, calling on "all academic senates to reject governmental decrees to adopt it, or, where adopted already, act to revoke it", in response to Education Secretary Gavin Williamson's attempt to force universities to adopt it, stating that it "inhibits free speech and academic freedom; it deprives Palestinians of their own legitimate voice within the UK public space; and, finally, it inhibits us, as Israeli nationals, from exercising our democratic right to challenge our own government." In February 2021, the lead signatory of that letter, Hagit Borer, opposed the Working Definition in the Times Higher Education Supplement, affirming that "It contradicts universities' commitment to free speech and academic freedom, and it undermines the ongoing fight against racism, including antisemitism, in all its ugly forms."

In Spring 2021, Independent Jewish Voices (Canada) (IJV) launched an academic petition and a petition for Jewish-Canadian academics against the working definition, initially signed by more than 500 and more than 150 scholars respectively (the former reaching over 600 as of early 2022). According to IJV, 32 faculty associations and academic unions in Canada have taken positions against it. Following its participation in the Malmö International Forum on Holocaust Remembrance and Combating Antisemitism in October 2021, the Canadian government pledged to "continue to enhance the adoption and implementation of the IHRA working definition of antisemitism". Subsequently, according to IJV and Middle East Monitor, in November 2021, the Canadian Association of University Teachers (CAUT), representing 72,000 academic faculty and staff at some 125 universities and colleges, passed a motion opposing the adoption of the IHRA definition by Canadian academic institutions.

Legal
In March 2017, human rights lawyer Hugh Tomlinson QC, who had been asked to give an opinion on the definition by Free Speech on Israel, Independent Jewish Voices, Jews for Justice for Palestinians and the Palestine Solidarity Campaign, criticised the IHRA definition as "unclear and confusing", saying it did not have "the clarity which would be required" from a legal definition of antisemitism." He addressed concerns that the definition conflates antisemitism with criticism of Israel and could be misused to curtail campaigning on behalf of Palestinians. He stated:

He presented his legal opinion on the new working definition at the House of Lords.

In May 2017, former Court of Appeal judge Stephen Sedley wrote an opinion piece in the London Review of Books arguing: "Shorn of philosophical and political refinements, anti-Semitism is hostility towards Jews as Jews. Where it manifests itself in discriminatory acts or inflammatory speech it is generally illegal, lying beyond the bounds of freedom of speech and of action. By contrast, criticism (and equally defence) of Israel or of Zionism is not only generally lawful: it is affirmatively protected by law. Endeavours to conflate the two by characterising everything other than anodyne criticism of Israel as anti-Semitic are not new. What is new is the adoption by the UK government (and the Labour Party) of a definition of anti-Semitism which endorses the conflation." In July 2018, Sedley wrote a letter to The Guardian'' saying: "...Sir William Macpherson did not advise that everything perceived as racist was ipso facto racist. He advised that reported incidents that were perceived by the victim as racist should be recorded and investigated as such. His purpose was to reverse the dismissive culture that characterised the reporting and policing of racial incidents. To derive from this fallacy a proposition that anything perceived by one or more Jewish people as antisemitic is legally an act of racism is not only absurd: it overlooks another aspect of legality, the right of free expression contained in article 10 of the European convention on human rights and now embodied in our law by the Human Rights Act. It is a right that may be qualified by proportionate legal restrictions necessary for protecting the rights of others: hence the legal bar on hate speech." Regarding the examples he said: "They point to the underlying purpose of the text: to neutralise serious criticism of Israel by stigmatising it as a form of antisemitism."

In July 2018, human rights solicitor Geoffrey Bindman wrote: "Unfortunately, the definition and the examples are poorly drafted, misleading, and in practice have led to the suppression of legitimate debate and freedom of expression. Nevertheless, clumsily worded as it is, the definition does describe the essence of antisemitism: irrational hostility towards Jews. The 11 examples are another matter. Seven of them refer to the state of Israel. This is where the problem arises. Some of them at least are not necessarily antisemitic. Whether they are or not depends on the context and on additional evidence of antisemitic intent."

In August 2018, Geoffrey Robertson QC, an expert on freedom of speech and human rights, said that the working definition fails to cover the most insidious forms of hostility to Jewish people. He said that several of the examples are so loosely drafted that they are likely to chill free speech, legitimate criticisms of the Israeli Government and coverage of human rights abuses against Palestinians. He said the definition was not intended to be binding and was not drafted as a comprehensible definition the British government's adoption of the working definition "has no legal effect" and recommended that any public bodies or organizations should follow the Home Affairs Committee recommendation and add to it the clarification that "it is not anti-Semitic to criticise the Government of Israel without additional evidence to suggest anti-Semitic intent." He concluded that "It is imprecise, confusing and open to misinterpretation and even manipulation... is not fit for any purpose that seeks to use it as an adjudicative standard" and political action against Israel is not properly characterised as antisemitic unless the action is intended to promote hatred or hostility against Jews in general.

Original drafter

In 2004, as the American Jewish Committee's antisemitism expert, Kenneth S. Stern was the lead drafter of the working definition and its examples. In 2015, he re-affirmed his belief in its efficacy: "No definition of something as complex as antisemitism can be perfect, but this one, ten years after its creation, remains a very good one." He stated that the definition was created "as a tool for data collectors in European countries to identify what to include and exclude from their reports about antisemitism, and to have a common frame of reference so that data might be compared across borders." He "encouraged the Department of State's first Special Envoy for Antisemitism to promote the definition as an important tool." He stated that he used it effectively as the framework for a report on global antisemitism. However, he added: "approaches to antisemitism that endorse and promote academic freedom are more likely to work, in part because they underscore the academy's goal of increasing knowledge and promoting critical thinking.... approaches that explain academic freedom away or harm it will not only fail, they make the problem worse." Therefore, he has cautioned against the free speech implications of legislating for its use on college campuses.

He has opposed efforts to enshrine it in university policies and in December 2016 wrote a letter to members of the US Congress warning that giving the definition legal status would be "unconstitutional and unwise". In 2011, he co-authored an article about how the 'Working Definition' was being abused in Title VI cases, because it was being employed in an attempt to "restrict academic freedom and punish political speech." In November 2017, Stern explained to the US House of Representatives that the definition has been abused on various US university campuses. He warned that it could "restrict academic freedom and punish political speech" and questioned whether definitions created by minority groups should be legislatively enshrined, giving as one of several examples: "Imagine a definition designed for Palestinians. If "Denying the Jewish people their right to self-determination, and denying Israel the right to exist" is antisemitism, then shouldn't "Denying the Palestinian people their right to self-determination, and denying Palestine the right to exist" be anti-Palestinianism? Would they then ask administrators to police and possibly punish campus events by pro-Israel groups who oppose the two state solution, or claim the Palestinian people are a myth?"  In December 2019, Stern said: "It was created primarily so that European data collectors could know what to include and exclude. That way antisemitism could be monitored better over time and across borders. It was never intended to be a campus hate speech code [...]".

Organizations
In August 2017, Jewish Voice for Labour (JVL) saw the working definition as "attempts to widen the definition of antisemitism beyond its meaning of hostility towards, or discrimination against, Jews as Jews". In August 2018, JVL thought the IHRA examples of antisemitism fell short of providing "a clear and unambiguous statement based on attitudes to Jews as Jews, not attitudes to a country, Israel".

In May 2018, the members' conference of the British civil liberties advocacy group Liberty passed a motion resolving that the definition could constitute a threat to freedom of expression by "conflating anti-semitism with criticism of Israel and legitimate defence of the rights of Palestinians."

In July 2018, a statement signed by 39 left-wing Jewish organizations in 15 countries, including six based in the UK, was released criticising the working definition, declaring that it was "worded in such a way as to be easily adopted or considered by western governments to intentionally equate legitimate criticisms of Israel and advocacy for Palestinian rights with antisemitism, as a means to suppress the former" and that "this conflation undermines both the Palestinian struggle for freedom, justice and equality and the global struggle against antisemitism. It also serves to shield Israel from being held accountable to universal standards of human rights and international law." The statement went on to urge governments, municipalities, universities and other institutions to reject the IHRA definition.

In November 2020, the leaders of Americans for Peace Now (APN) wrote to the Conference of Presidents of Major American Jewish Organizations (CoP) that APN "... will not adopt the full version of the IHRA Working Definition of Antisemitism (with the accompanying examples) ...". They clarified that "The problem is not with the definition itself but rather with the accompanying examples, which CoP members are requested to endorse as an integral part of the definition. Some of these examples go far beyond what can reasonably be regarded as antisemitism. They cross the line into the realm of politics and are already being used to score political points in the United States, and to quash legitimate criticism of deplorable Israeli government policies."

In December 2020, an updated list of individuals and organizations opposed to the adoption of the Working Definition, including Independent Jewish Voices (Canada), was posted in the Times of Israel blogs by the National Coordinator of Independent Jewish Voices Canada.

Response to criticism
In December 2017, the Board of Deputies of British Jews wrote that "there is a worrying resistance from universities to adopting it and free speech is given as the primary reason for their reluctance. It is said to be 'contentious' because some people argue that current concerns surrounding antisemitism are motivated by ulterior motives, namely defending the policies of the Israeli government. We would suggest that if a definition of prejudice against any other community referenced arguments that their concerns were even partially guided by ulterior motives then that community would infer that the definition did not take prejudice and discrimination against their group seriously. It is also not an assault on free speech to say that students or staff should not be indulging antisemitic tropes. Rather, it is part of what makes a healthy society."

Competing definitions of antisemitism

Jerusalem Declaration on Antisemitism 

Objections to the IHRA Definition of Antisemitism motivated the creation of the Jerusalem Declaration on Antisemitism, released in March 2021. This document, signed by some 200 international scholars, is intended to be used instead of the IHRA definition, or as a supplement to guide interpretation of the IHRA definition for groups that have already adopted it.

Nexus Task Force 

In the same month, a group of scholars and leaders affiliated with the Annenberg School for Communication and Journalism at the University of Southern California called the Nexus Task Force published a definition of antisemitism titled "Understanding Antisemitism at its Nexus with Israel and Zionism", which asserts that most criticism of Zionism and of Israel is not antisemitic, as well as a "Guide to Identifying Antisemitism in Debates about Israel". The task force members included Kenneth S. Stern, who had been the lead drafter of the IHRA working definition and its examples. In September 2020, "more than 100 prominent Jewish leaders" sent a letter to Joe Biden endorsing the task force's work.

Independent Jewish Voices Canada 
In 2020, Independent Jewish Voices Canada published a definition of antisemitism which states that: "antisemitism is not an exceptional form of bigotry. People who hate, discriminate and/or attack Jews, will also hate, discriminate and/or attack other protected groups—including racialized people, Muslims, LGBTQ2+, women, Indigenous peoples."

See also
Three Ds of antisemitism

Notes

References

Citations

Sources

Further reading
 
Feldman, David. Sub-Report commissioned to assist the All-Party Parliamentary Inquiry into Antisemitism. Institute for Jewish Policy Research. 1 January 2015
 
 
 "Knesset finally adopts IHRA definition of antisemitism" ; Zvika klein; The Jerusalem Post. 23 June 2022.

External links

2004 documents
2000s in politics
Opposition to antisemitism
Definition of antisemitism controversy
Freedom of speech
New antisemitism